The Battle of Romania in World War II comprised several operations in or around Romania in 1944, as part of the Eastern Front, in which the Soviet Army defeated Axis (German and Romanian) forces in the area, Romania changed sides, and Soviet and Romanian forces drove the Germans back into Hungary.

Soviet troops entered Romanian territory during the Uman–Botoșani offensive in March 1944, capturing several towns in northern Moldavia, including Botoșani. 

According to historian David Glantz, the Soviet Union  attempted to invade Romania during the spring of 1944, through the territory of present-day Moldova. Between 8 April and 6 June, the Soviet Army launched the first Jassy–Kishinev offensive, so named after two major cities Iași (Jassy) and Chișinău (Kishinev) in the area. A series of military engagements took place, with the objective of cutting off vital Axis defensive lines in Northern Romania, thus facilitating a subsequent advance by the Red Army into the entire Balkan region. Soviet forces failed to overcome German and Romanian defenses in the region. According to Glantz, the offensive operation ultimately failed, mainly due to the poor combat performance of Soviet troops and the effectiveness of German defensive preparations.

The major attack of the Battle of Romania – the second Jassy–Kishinev offensive, between 20 August and 29 August – was a Soviet victory. The German Sixth Army was encircled by the initial Soviet onslaught and was destroyed for the second time (the first time was at the Battle of Stalingrad).

On 23 August, King Michael of Romania led a coup d'état against Prime Minister Ion Antonescu; the new government surrendered to the Allies and declared war on Germany. Romanian historian Florin Constantiniu claims this shortened World War II in Europe by six months.

The Axis front collapsed. In the north, the German Eighth Army retreated to Hungary with heavy losses. Elsewhere, many Germans were cut off and captured, such as the large security and anti-aircraft force posted at the Ploiești oil field. Other fragments of the German forces fled toward Hungary as best they could, fighting the Romanians and Soviet forces, which stormed through the Carpathian Mountains. (Several passes through the mountains were held by Romanian troops.)

The Soviet victory in Romania caused Bulgaria to withdraw from the Axis on 26 August, and allowed Soviet forces to invade it on 8 September.

By 24 September, nearly all of Romania was under Allied control.

References 

Romania
Romania
Romania
Military history of Romania during World War II
Romania
Romania–Soviet Union relations
Romania
Romania
German–Romania military relations

fi:Romanian taistelu